Dr Cryme is the stage name of Darlington Kwasi Agyekum, a Ghanaian rapper and early proponent of the Ghanaian "twipop" genre. Dr Cryme has also performed as a TV presenter, a brand ambassador and is CEO of Twipop Recordz.

Agyekum was born in Tema and began making music in his early school days.  He studied at the Datus School and then attended ASUTECH in Cape Coast and Sotech in Somanya before earning a certificate in broadcast journalism from the Ghana Institute of Journalism.

Life and music career
Agyekum's stage name Dr. Cryme is an acronym which means Doctor (of the) Creative Rhymes You Most Enjoy. Whilst in high school, Agyekum gained himself underground popularity through "Kasahare Level"; a  popular rap competition on Adom FM (an Accra based radio station) which featured Sarkodie, Stay Jay and the like. It was through these rap battles and his style of music which caught the eye of the Ejams record label to sign him in 2010. He released his first hit single "Kill me shy" the same year.
In 2011, he released his debut album called "Finally Finally". In 2012, his "Kill me shy" emerged the song "Hip life song of the year" at the Ghana Music Awards. He was also nominated for the "Song Writer of the year", "Most Popular Song of the Year", and "Hip life/Hip Hop Artiste of the Year" categories.
Agyekum released his sophomore album entitled Showtime in February 2018. The twenty tracked album includes the hit single "Koko Sakora" which features Sarkodie.

Business career and endorsements
Dr. Cryme performed as a  presenter for 4 syte TV in 2011. He hosted the ‘Top 10 Videos’ which was aired on ETV Ghana. In the same year, Agyekum was officially unveiled as the Brand Ambassador for Samsung Ghana.

Agyekum was involved in the UN Volunteers Day Chokor project which was pegged to the Copenhagen conference.

Awards and nominations

Ghana Music Awards UK

|-
|rowspan="2"|2016
||Himself
|Afrobeat Artist Of The Year
|
|-
||Koko Sakora ft Sarkodie
|Best Collaboration Of The Year
|

Ghana Music Awards

|-
|rowspan="5"|2012
|rowspan="3"|Himself
|Best New Artist
|
|-
|Hip hop/Hip Life artist of the year
|
|-
|Songwriter of the year
|
|-
||Kill Me Shy
|Most Popular Song Of The Year
|
|-
||Kill Me Shy
|Hiplife Song Of The Year"
|

4syte Music Video Awards

|-
|rowspan="5"|2016
|rowspan="4"|Koko Sakora ft Sarkodie
|Best Collaboration Video
|
|-
|Best Hiplife Video 
|
|-
|Most Popular Video
|
|-
|Best Photography Video
|
|-
||Rise
|Best Hip Hop Video
|
|-
|rowspan="3"|2011
|rowspan="2"|Kill Me Shy
|Best Hip Life Video
|
|-
|Best Male Video
|
|-
||Himself
|Discovery of the Year
|

Golden Heart Awards

|-
| style="text-align:centre,"|2011
|Himself
|Most Influential Artist
|

High School Honours

|-
| style="text-align:centre,"|2011
|Himself
|Most Influential Artist
|

Ashaiman Music Awards

Discography

Albums 

Finally Finally (2012)
Showtime
Unexpected

References

External links 
 

Ghanaian rappers
1986 births
Living people
People from Tema